This is a list of people notable for living for periods of more than a week in airports. The reasons are usually protesting, asylum seeking or having holiday difficulties, having difficulty with visas and passports.

List of residents

See also 
 International zone
 Statelessness
 Lost in Transit, 1993 film
 Flight, 1998 opera
 The Terminal, 2004 film

References 

airports
Statelessness
Lists of airports